Lottie Williams (1874–1962) was an American actress.

Lottie Williams may also refer to:

 Lottie Williams, an Oklahoma resident who is the only person to have been struck by re-entering space debris, when a small piece of the rocket launching the Midcourse Space Experiment harmlessly struck her shoulder in 1997
 Lottie Williams, a victim of a 1980 murder for which Leonard Marvin Laws was executed by the U.S. state of Missouri in 1990